No. 16 Squadron, nicknamed the Black Panthers, is a multi-role squadron of the Pakistan Air Force's Northern Air Command. It is currently based at Minhas Airbase and operates the PAC JF-17 Thunder multi-role jets.

History

The squadron was established in 1957 under the command of Squadron Leader Imam-ul-Haq Khan, equipped with F-86F Sabre fighter aircraft and assigned the role of Tactical Attack. It was temporarily disbanded in 1963 and reestablished on 13 April 1970 at PAF Base Masroor, flying the F-86F Sabre and commanded by Wing Commander Sharbat Ali Changazi. In February 1971, as the Fighter Leaders School, the unit was assigned to train senior pilots in advanced tactics. Although the squadron was not employed in the Indo-Pakistani War of 1971, its pilots were transferred to PAF Base Peshawar, where they flew with the No. 26 Squadron. Changazi lead several strike missions into Indian territory and shot down an Indian Air Force Hawker Hunter. Squadron Leader Cecil Chaudhry, attached to No. 18 Squadron, was shot down by ground fire but ejected safely and later shot down an Indian Sukhoi Su-7.

The squadron was disbanded in October 1972 and reestablished in 1982 at PAF Base Rafiqui, equipped with the Shenyang F-6. It was decided that the Panthers would be the first squadron to be reequipped with the Nanchang A-5C attack fighter, and personnel were sent to China to be trained on it. The first batch of A-5s was delivered to PAF Base Rafiqui on 12 February 1983, a reequipment ceremony was held on 21 March 1983, the squadron was assigned the role of tactical attack, and Wing Commander Hamid Saeed Khan was put in command. A Pakistan Day flypast on 23 March 1983 earned the squadron a "Best Fly-Past" award. The Panthers also converted pilots of the No. 7 ("Bandits") and No. 26 ("Black Spiders") squadrons to fly the Nanchang A-5C. In November 1985, the unit began practicing with live 750 lb bombs and extensive Dissimilar Air Combat Training (DACT) with the PAF's F-16 squadrons.

In 1988, more DACT sorties were flown against the Chengdu F-7P. Five A-5Cs were added to the squadron's fleet in May 1989, and in mid-1990 Wing Commander Zafar evaluated the upgraded A-5M and A-5F attack fighters in China. In 1991, three Shenyang FT-6 dual-seat fighters with Martin-Baker ejection seats were inducted for training purposes. In November 1991 the unit was temporarily transferred to Multan and flew 115 sorties from there with 100% serviceability and reliability rates. In 1997 the squadron was again temporarily transferred to PAF Base Minhas and Murid during runway recarpeting at the unit's parent airbase. A deployment to PAF Base Chaklala for Air Defence Alert duties was also carried out. In 1998 an A-5's canopy jettisoned during an Exercise Wide Awake sortie, but the aircraft landed safely.

2019 Jammu & Kashmir Airstrikes 

In February 2019, 2 JF-17s from the No. 26 Squadron armed with Mark 83 REK bombs participated in the retaliatory airstrikes in Indian Administered Kashmir and dropped their bombs near Indian military installations.

Aircraft Flown

Gallery

Exercises

Regular

 Exercise Flat Out
 1988
 1989
 1991
 1992 ×3
 1996 ×3
 1998

 Exercise Wide Awake
 1988 – ×2
 1989 – ×3
 1991
 1992 – ×4
 1996 – ×3
 1998

 DACT Camps (Dissimilar Air Combat Training)
 1985 – extensive training sorties flown against the F-16.
 1988 – 1v1 sorties evaluating F-7P against A-5C.
 1992
 1993
 1998 – ×2, PAF Base Minhas

Annual and others

 Jetstream 1983
 High Mark 85
 High Mark 86 – offensive sorties flown. Also participated in a live armament exercise at Thal Range.
 Long Shadow 88 – February 1988.
 Shako 88
 High Mark 89 – deployed to PAF Base Farid.
 High Mark 93 – October
 High Mark 95
 Saffron Bandit 95
 Hit Hard-VI – April 88
 Hit Hard-VII – June 88
 Hit Hard-VIII – August 88

 Fake-XIV (1988)
 Hit Hard (1989)
 Tondo-II, Tondo-III, Tondo-IV (1989)
 Combat VI (91)
 Sore Eyes-III (91)
 Condor-II (91)
 King Cobra 92 – 100% mission success rate achieved.
 Fire Fox 97 – March, an Air Defence exercise during which low level sorties were flown to train interceptor pilots.
 Zarb-e-Aahen 98
 Saffron Bandit 98 – PAF Base Sargodha

 Armament exercises
 December 1988 – Matra Durandal firing, Somniani Range.
 1996 – Air-to-air firing, PAF Base Masroor.
 Awards
 ACES 97 (Air Combat Evaluations) – received ACES Trophy for best performing tactical attack squadron.
 Inter-Squadron Dive Bombing Competition – No. 16 and 26 squadrons competed, No. 16 won.

In Popular Media 
The Squadron was featured in the 2019 Pakistani Film Sherdil in which the protagonist Haris is deployed in the No. 16 Squadron and flies the PAC JF-17 Thunder & his grandfather too who flew North American F-86 Sabres of the No. 16 squadron during the 1965 Conflict with India.

See also

List of Pakistan Air Force squadrons
No.17 Squadron PAF
No.26 Squadron PAF

References

External links
PAF s' No. 16 'Black Panthers' Squadrons History: 1948–1988
PAF s' No. 16 'Black Panthers' Squadrons History: 1988–1998

Pakistan Air Force squadrons